This was a new event in 2012.

Nicole Gibbs won the title, defeating Julie Coin in the final, 6–2, 3–6, 6–4.

Seeds

Draw

Finals

Top half

Bottom half

References 
Main Draw
Qualifying Draw

Colorado International - Singles